The Ambassador is a historic apartment building located at Indianapolis, Indiana.  It was built in 1924, and is a large six-story, tan cinder brick building. The first floor has Chicago school style commercial storefronts. It has a recessed entrance with detailed metal canopy and features Sullivanesque terra cotta ornamental detailing.

It was listed on the National Register of Historic Places in 1983.

References

Apartment buildings in Indiana
Residential buildings on the National Register of Historic Places in Indiana
Residential buildings completed in 1924
Residential buildings in Indianapolis
National Register of Historic Places in Indianapolis
Chicago school architecture in Indiana